Horadandia brittani is a species of very small cyprinid fish that is endemic to coastal floodplains in South India.  Originally described as a subspecies of H. atukorali, it was elevated to species level in 2013. It can grow to  standard length.

References

Danios
Cyprinid fish of Asia
Freshwater fish of India
Fish described in 1992
Endemic fauna of India
Taxa named by Ambat Gopalan Kutty Menon